The 1964 Princeton Tigers football team was an American football team that represented Princeton University during the 1964 NCAA University Division football season. A year after sharing an Ivy League co-championship, Princeton went undefeated to win the league outright.

In their eighth year under head coach Dick Colman, the Tigers compiled a 9–0 record and outscored opponents 216 to 53. Cosmo Iacavazzi, who would later be inducted into the College Football Hall of Fame, was the team captain. At the end of the year, the Tigers were ranked No. 13 in the nation the UPI Coaches Poll. 

Princeton's 7–0 conference record was the best in the Ivy League standings. The Tigers outscored Ivy opponents 197 to 46. 

Princeton played its home games at Palmer Stadium on the university campus in Princeton, New Jersey.

Schedule

References

Princeton
Princeton Tigers football seasons
Ivy League football champion seasons
College football undefeated seasons
Princeton Tigers football